The Elk River is a short river in the Lake Michigan drainage basin of the U.S. state of Michigan.  It is only  in length and flows from Elk Lake into Grand Traverse Bay of Lake Michigan.  It forms a waterway and harbor for the municipality of Elk Rapids.

When the larger lake's level dropped, a belt of sediment separated Elk Lake from Grand Traverse Bay, and a short, whitewater river, Elk River, formed to provide drainage for the smaller lake.

The Indians named the river Meguzee, in honor of the Anishinaabe name for the bald eagle.  In the early 19th century, Euro-American settlers arrived.  In 1858, someone discovered a pair of elk antlers in the rapids; the rapids, river, and lake were renamed after the dead animal.

The rapids are quiet now, as a hydroelectric dam has been built.  Boats must portage the dam, using adjacent boat ramps.  Below the dam, the river opens out into Grand Traverse Bay and forms the harbor of Elk Rapids.

See also 
 Elk River Chain of Lakes Watershed

References

External links

 Map of Elk River, with location of dam

Rivers of Antrim County, Michigan
Rivers of Michigan
Tributaries of Lake Michigan